Clampett may refer to:

 The Bob Clampett Show, program on the Cartoon Network
 The Ballad of Jed Clampett, theme song for the television series The Beverly Hillbillies, which ran from 1962 to 1971
 Jed Clampett, fictional character played by Buddy Ebsen on the American comedy television series The Beverly Hillbillies

Surname
 Bob Clampett (1913–1984), American animator
 Bobby Clampett (b. 1960), television golf analyst and former PGA Tour golfer

See also
Clampitt, a surname